Bungulla may refer to:

 Bungulla, Western Australia
 Bungulla, a genus of Australian spiders